is a Japanese manga series written by Huang Jin Zhou (a unit composed of Hiromu Arakawa, Genco, and Studio Flag) and illustrated by Hiromu Arakawa. It was serialized in Square Enix's Gangan Powered and later moved to Monthly Shōnen Gangan, when the magazine was closed. The motif of the story was inspired by Chinese wuxia drama and novels. The world view is rooted in Chinese folklore and history, as well as having an element of fantasy.

Plot

Manga
A period piece, Jūshin Enbu features Taitou, a young man who hates the empire that rules at the time, with his sister Laila as they learn of a mysterious power Taitou holds, unbeknownst to him. Taitou is the incarnation of a mysterious star that grants him a huge amount of power that he has yet to fully master. Joining them is Ryuukou, who has power similar to Taitou, just more honed.

After Taitou's coming of age ceremony, which required him being beaten by Ryuukou, he is given the Kenkaranpu, described as a conqueror's sword, which Taitou is not even capable of drawing. Soon after, he and Laila are greeted by a man named Shimei, who wants to take the sword. After a quick exchange of blows, Shimei explains the source of Taitou's power - the star Hagun, one of the most powerful Hokushin-Tenkun. When Shimei uses his own sword's power to cause Laila to stop breathing, Taitou becomes so angry he releases Hagun's power, draws Kenkaranpu and pins Shimei to the wall by throwing the Kenkaranpu through his stomach. He then turns to Ryuukou and attacks. Despite his best efforts, Ryuukou cannot overcome Hagun's power. It is only a resuscitated Laila's intervention (along with a nasty head butt) that brings Taitou to his senses. However, they all soon learn that Shimei had escaped with the sword.

At midnight, Taitou sneaks out to recover the sword. As he leaves, Ryuukou and Laila quickly join him on his journey. As they travel, they come to the canal town of Jousei. While they're there, Ryuukou attempts to teach Taitou how to control his ki, and with it, the power of his star. When you don't refine and focus the power, it exits the body any way it can, leaving the body covered with cuts from the power exiting. But Taito is too impatient to learn Ryuukou's way, who was trained by monks. The three are living in an inn in the refugee section of town, right next to the canal. It starts raining hard, and Ryuukou worries about the levee walls holding. At the inn, the three meet Koyou, a handsome ship captain, who does ladies make-up for entertainment. As they talk, the city officials close the inner canal gates to protect their harbor, not caring that it puts the refugee section in danger of being flooded. When the refugees try to enter the city for safety, they are refused access, even as the levee bursts right into the section. Taitou tells Ryuukou to break the flood gates to release the pressure, because he can control his ki. He does so, but is still dangling over the water when a downed tree hits a bridge, breaks it, and heads towards him. Taitou, in a reckless attempt to save his friend, leaps from the gate walls and smashes the debris, unfortunately forgetting to attach himself to something, and so falls into the canal. Ryuukou jumps in after him, and pulls him onto a floating piece of wood, where he then starts to berate him for almost sacrificing himself, saying he should have left him. Taitou is explaining that he could not abandon a friend like that, when their piece of wood hits an obstruction and disintegrates. Taitou starts to drown, and Ryuukou finds the current too strong for him to carry both of them as he is, and Taitou glimpses the symbol of a star on his chest before he falls unconscious.

Later, Taitou finds out that Laila had found Koyou, the man from the inn, and had gotten his help in saving the two. He then rounds on Ryuukou, asking why he had been hiding that he was one of the Hokushin-Tenkun. Ryuukou just felt like the right time never came up, revealing the his star is "Bukyoku", the star right next to "Hagun". They are joined by Laila and Koyou, who directs their attention to his "modest ship", a massive barge he calls "Touga". He then loads all the refugees onto it, promising to take care of them. By this time Shimei has reached the capital and Shogun Kiero Hakuhou, who he then presents with the Kenkaranpu.

Much of the storyline revolves around the revelations of an ancient prophecy concerning the Stars, which relate to the seven stars in the Big Dipper constellation, being given human form at a time of crisis for humanity.  Although all seven of the Stars are superhuman fighters, two of them are known as the Noble Spirits, and according to destiny will fight each other to take control of the Empire.  As the various Stars identities are revealed, they appear to ally themselves to either Keiro (whose star is Tonrou) or Taitou (whose star is Hagun).  Because of the cruelty of the previous rulers of the Empire, and many corrupt officials still in power, Keiro has chosen to act with the prophecy and try to become Emperor himself.  Taitou, although briefly considering this, ultimately rejects the prophecy entirely, choosing to forge his own destiny.

The other Stars are Ryuukou, who grew up in the same village as Taitou; Hosei, who trained under a strong woman warrior who had learned much about the prophecy of the Stars; Koyou, who spends most of the story on his barge ship; Rinmei, a woman who loves Ryuukou and has anger management issues; and Shoukakou, a mysterious man in the capital city who at first seems to be working for Keiro.  The story also involves dealing with grief, loss, responsibility, and starting over even when you feel the weight of your sins means you cannot take another step.

Anime
In the anime, Shogun/General Keiro under cover of dark tries to steal the Kenkaranpu from Tian Long temple. In doing this he massacres dozens of the ascetic monks that were living out their vows of protection and love behind the Tian Long temple's walls, but also, Keiro is confronted by the plucky Taito for the first of their 4 face offs over the 26 episodes.

There are some differences between the plot of the manga and the anime, including which characters live or die, who fights when and where, and how the final battles play out.  For example, in the anime, Keiro actually manages to absorb Shimei inside of himself, and gains supernatural powers, controlling Ryuukou against his will and turning some people into demons.  Although the overall impact of the battle between Keiro and Taitou is largely the same in both the manga and the anime, the fine details are not.  Also, in the manga, there appears to be seven years between the end of the battle between Keiro and Taitou and the final scenes.  In the anime, there's an unspecified time skip, but the characters don't appear to have aged significantly, so it wouldn't seem to be as long as seven years.

Characters

The Two Celestial Deities

A 16-year-old youth. He is very headstrong, does not like losing, and though reckless is quite a skilled fighter. He opposes the officials in order to protect the people and his companions. He also has a habit of repeating himself when flustered or angry. The relationship he has with his sister Laila (not related by blood) changes as they both begin to get feelings for one another; when out of control only she can control him back to normal.
He has the Hokushin-Tenkun mark of Alkaid, Hagun (破軍), on his right shoulder which mean he is the incarnation of the war and celestial god alkaid. He is also part of the law enforcing organization, Seiryutou (青龍党, Blue Dragon Group), which is based at Lotus Temple at Taishan. The group take care of events from rebel raids to violence inflicted by officials. The group overestimated their strength and took on Keirou and in the end lost most of their people. Taitō, seeking revenge for his comrades, left on a journey to train up.
In the manga, the Kenkaranpu (賢嘉爛舞) was to be given to Taitō on his coming of age ceremony by Sonnei but it was seized by Shimei, turning the journey to that of the recovery of the sword. In the anime, the sword was taken by Keirō after a fight between Taitō and the general during the former's invasion of the temple.
Taitō meets the emperor later on in the anime and it is revealed that Taitō is the older brother of the emperor and that they were separated because Taitō bore the 'Hagun' mark.

35 years old. He has the Hokushin-Tenkun mark of Dubhe, Tonrō (貪狼), on his left shoulder which means that he is the incarnation of the war and celestial god dubhe. A general of the imperial army and the leader of the Black Wolf Party. He aims to be the emperor of the Ken Empire.
In the anime, he forced his way into Lotus Temple with his troops to retrieve the sacred sword Kenkaranpu. It is said that the one who unsheathe it will get the right to rule as Emperor. To get the sword many monks and Seiryutou members were killed.  While in both the anime and the manga, Keirou chooses to kill everyone in the Empire, in the manga it is because he believes the prophecy means that mankind must die, whereas in the anime, he becomes more or less a demon himself and kills because he feels he is not bound to human laws or mercy.

The Five Divine Warriors

The 18-year-old bearer of the Mizar, Bukyoku (武曲), mark. Uses a staff in battle. He is the adopted son of a master from another temple of the Rikka Sect, Ryuushou Moukan. His original name is Keikō and Keirō is his real father. Ryūkō is a serious person who expects highly from himself. He has a bad sense of direction. The Bukyoku mark is at his right pectoral. He is in love with Rinmei.
In chapter 9 of the Manga, Ryūkō faces off against Keirō to allow Taitō, who is not match for Keirō at this time, a chance to escape. After the battle with Keirō, Ryūkō meets up with Taitō, in chapter 10, and has apparently switched his support from the Hagun (Taitō) to the Tonrō (Keirō) and supports his campaign to usurp the Emperor. Later, his support is questioned by Keirō, so as a test, Keirō ordered Ryūkō to carry out the death sentence of his adoptive father, Ryuushou Moukan. After doing so, Ryūkō has a crisis of loyalty and seems to fall into a bottomless despair.

The 17-year-old bearer of the Phecda, Rokuson (禄存), mark. The archer of the group, a carefree and hot-headed person. He is attracted to Laila. The Rokuson mark is at the back of his right hand. His weapon is the Soutenkyuu, a bladed bow that can also be divided and used as twin bladed swords.
In the manga, from chapter 10–14, Hōsei becomes the main support for Taitō after they both believe that Ryūkō is dead and after Ryūkō abandons them for his father, Keirō. In chapter 14, Hōsei finally gets revenge for his master by defeating and "killing" Shimei, but is mortally wounded in the battle. He dies in Taitō's arms. Shimei then takes control of his corpse to try to kill Laila, and Laila is forced to destroy the corpse, apologizing to Hōsei as she does so. Years later, Laila wears his necklace and still visits his grave.
In the anime, however, Hosei is not killed by Shimei, and witnesses Taitou's battle with Keirou, and is shown talking with Laila at the end of the series while looking at the multitude of stars above their village home.

The 22-year-old bearer of the Merak, Monkoku (文曲), mark. The leader of a group of sea bandits. Although a big, lively and rough person, he has skillful fingers and has interest in cooking and make-up. He wields an eight-section staff. He also seems to have a paralyzing fear of heights. The Monkoku mark is at his neck.

The 24-year-old bearer of the Alioth, Renjō (廉貞),  mark. He is the teacher of the current emperor Taigatei. Usually seen smiling and basically a calm person, yet under that exterior he is actually a tactician who resorts to any means to keep the Ken Empire going. Any action he undertakes is usually for the good of the Ken Empire. The Renjou mark is at his right palm.  In the anime, it is revealed that he is actually afflicted with some sort of fatal disease, and expects to die soon.  But in the manga, he believes that both Hagun and Tonrou are disastrous for humankind, and works for peace.

The 20-year-old bearer of the Megrez, Komon (巨門), mark. In love with Ryuukou but she hates his unsociable attitude. She cooks for the temple Ryūkō is from. She is concerned that she looks older than her age. She is the type that becomes scary when angry. The Komon mark is at her right thigh. In the anime, she fights with Ryuukou, but in the manga, she does not go to the final battle, because she is pregnant with Ryuukou's son.

Others

14 years old. Taitō's little sister (not by blood). She is the daughter of Sōei, the leader of Seiryutō. She is often seen quarreling with Taitō and has generally won every time they have quarrelled. The only person who can stop Taitō when he acts recklessly.  After her father's death, in chapter 11 of the manga, She has a moment of crisis, aided by Shimei and his sword, in which she blames Taitou, until she realizes later that he is not to blame for the deaths that are happening around her. She has to fight Shimei when he possesses Housei's corpse, and in the battle it is revealed she is a descendant of the shaman who controlled the stars- hence her ability to control Taito. She uses this power to defeat Shimei for good. Later, she becomes chief of the village in her father's stead.

The 16-year-old Emperor of the Ken Empire. Good-hearted and has no self thought. He would like to change the Empire into a better place, yet he does not have much power - in reality members of his court govern the Empire. He and Taitō are twins, with Taigatei being the younger brother. The brothers were separated when they were about three, but while Taitou remembers that he was taken away from his original parents and brother, neither he nor Taigatei are aware of their relationship until others reveal it to them.  He promises to Taitou to become a good Emperor who helps the people of his empire.

A follower of Keirō. One of the primary antagonists, he is a sorcerer who manipulates many people from behind the scenes all for the purpose of seeing "people die." He holds the demon sword of all seeing eye, Banshoushimei (萬詳史明) and is able to use spells.  "Shimei" is who ever holds the Banshoushimei. He has had three separate bodies in the Manga. He possesses the body of Hōsei Meitoku in an attempt to kill Laila Seiren and take her body, but Laila destroys him for good, cutting the Banshoushimei in half.

Taitō's and Laila's father. A former member of the Imperial Army, now leader of Seiryutou. After having roamed the Empire, his master Sonnei asked him to settle down at Lotus Temple. He is killed by Shimei.

The elderly High priest of Lotus Temple (the headquarters of the Rikka Sect[六伽宗]) and former master of Souei. A master of the gaiden technique (外伝法) who is well known in the Empire. Has a weakness for women.

A subordinate of Keirō. A quiet and unsociable person. In the anime, he is Taki's real father, and is killed while protecting Taki and Taigatei from Keiro. In the manga, he survives.

Keirō's adopted daughter who entered the Court as a princess candidate. A quiet and sweet-natured girl. She and Taigatei are in love and they eventually marry.

Originally from a foreign country but stowaway to the Ken Empire. She was then picked up by Keirou and now serves him loyally. Now a court lady attached to the Emperor where she guides the weak-willed Emperor to follow Keirou's wishes. She distrusts Ryuukou and Shōkaku, despite their claims to serve Keirou. In the anime, Shōkaku deducts, apparently correctly, that she is in love with Keirou.

Hosei's teacher who also subsequently taught Taitō the different ways of using Soukihō, Gaiden for weaponry and Naiden for strengthening the human body. Extremely knowledgeable and well read. Killed in a confrontation with Shimei. Shimei addressed her as Chisenkyuu (智泉玖), indicating some kind of prior relationship.  In Volume 5, it seems that Koei was a disciple of Shimei when the spirit lived inside a woman's body, and Shimei tried to kill Koei then before assuming the body he inhabits for most of the series.
Mo Han

Production
The origins of Hero Tales came from a work by doujin group "Dennou Sanzoku Bukando"(電脳山賊武漢堂) called "Shishi Juushin Enbu"(獅子獣神演武). The work is an illustrated net novel and later released as a doujinshi. Dennou Sanzoku Bukando is the doujin group formed by Hiromu Arakawa and Zhang Fei Long. Juushin Embu is announced after seven years of conceptualizing and planning.

The events that led to the announcement of Juushin Embu (from Hiromu Arakawa interview, Pafu -March 2007 issue): In 2005, Huang Jin Zhou brought the plan to Hiromu which is then brought to Square Enix. In the beginning of the project, Hiromu was only in charge of character design. Huang Jin Zhou took care of other matters such as creating the scenario. Before the serialization, Hiromu and Studio Flag took seven years to conceptualize this original story.

Media

Manga
Hero Tales is authored by Huang Jin Zhou (a unit composed of Hiromu Arakawa, Genco, and Studio Flag) and illustrated by Arakawa. The manga was serialized in Square Enix's Gangan Powered from October 21, 2006, to February 21, 2009. It was then serialized in Monthly Shōnen Gangan from May 12, 2009, to August 12, 2010. Square Enix collected its chapters in five tankōbon volumes, released from August 11, 2007, to November 22, 2010.

The first tankōbon was published in English by Yen Press in October, 2009 and began serializing in Yen Plus February 2009 issue.

Volume list

Anime
On October 7, 2007, an anime series based on the manga premiered in TV Tokyo under the title of Juushin Embu -HERO TALES-(獣神演武 -HERO TALES-). The series is produced by Studio Flag and directed by Osamu Sekita. Manga illustrator Hiromu Arakawa was also in charge of making the characters designs. With a total of 26 episodes, the anime aired from October 7, 2007, to March 30, 2008. On January 7, 2010, Funimation Entertainment announced that it has acquired the anime. The series made its North American television debut on May 17, 2011, on the Funimation Channel.

Opening theme
"Winterlong" by BEAT CRUSADERS
"Flashback" by HIGH and MIGHTY COLOR
Ending theme
"Kakegae no nai Hito e (かけがえのない人へ)" by Mai Hoshimura
Komorebi no Uta by HIGH and MIGHTY COLOR

Video game
A game called Juushin Embu DS was developed by ThinkArts and released for the Nintendo DS by D3 Publisher on November 22, 2007, exclusively in Japan.

References

External links
 Anime official site
 Hero Tales - The Official Anime Website from FUNimation
 TV Tokyo Juushin Enbu Hero Tales site 
 

2006 manga
Adventure anime and manga
Funimation
Gangan Comics manga
Hiromu Arakawa
Historical fantasy anime and manga
Martial arts anime and manga
Shōnen manga
Square Enix franchises
Yen Press titles